Gong Jinjie (born 12 November 1986) is a Chinese professional track cyclist, a member of the provincial Jilin Team since 2002 and the Chinese National Team since 2005. Her coaches include Yongqing Wang and Sean Eadie.

Career
Gong competed in the 2012 Summer Olympics in London. She and Guo Shuang set a world record of 32.447 seconds in the qualification round of the team sprint event, which they then improved upon with 32.422 in the next round. They went on to finish first in the final against the German team, but were disqualified for an alleged "early relay", and were relegated to the silver medal instead. Gong and Guo's coach Daniel Morelon maintains that the pair were "robbed" of the gold medal, and described it as an "injustice". He complained that the judges refused to provide a "video footage of the race on slow motion", and only provided a "vague explanation" for the infringement they had allegedly committed.

Gong competed in the 2016 Summer Olympics in Rio de Janeiro. She and Zhong Tianshi set a world record of 31.928 seconds in the qualification round of the team sprint event, and won China's first ever Olympics Cycling gold medal in the final by beating the Russian team.

Career highlights

2014
1st  Team Sprint, Asian Games (with Zhong Tianshi)
2015
GP von Deutschland im Sprint
1st Team Sprint (with Zhong Tianshi)
3rd Sprint
2016
1st  Team Sprint, Asian Track Championships (with Zhong Tianshi)

References

External links

1986 births
Living people
Chinese female cyclists
Chinese track cyclists
Place of birth missing (living people)
People from Liaoyuan
Cyclists at the 2012 Summer Olympics
Cyclists at the 2016 Summer Olympics
Olympic cyclists of China
2016 Olympic gold medalists for China
Olympic silver medalists for China
Olympic medalists in cycling
Cyclists from Jilin
Medalists at the 2012 Summer Olympics
Asian Games medalists in cycling
Cyclists at the 2006 Asian Games
Cyclists at the 2014 Asian Games
Asian Games gold medalists for China
Asian Games silver medalists for China
Medalists at the 2006 Asian Games
Medalists at the 2014 Asian Games
Universiade medalists in cycling
Universiade gold medalists for China
Medalists at the 2011 Summer Universiade